Siddalingaiah (15 December 1936 – 12 March 2015) was an Indian film director, scriptwriter and producer who worked mainly in the Kannada films. He was well known for his distinct film-making style, and the industry knew him as a master of social themes and rural subject matter. He was one of the most commercially successful directors in the Kannada industry. He began his film career in 1964 as a director with Mayor Muthanna (1969). In a career that spanned 30 years, he directed over 20 films.

His most well-known films usually starred matinee idol Rajkumar. They have collaborated 7 times. His most popular works include Bangaarada Manushya, Bhootayyana Maga Ayyu, Nyayave Devaru, Biligiriya Banadalli, Doorada Betta and Bhoolokadalli Yamaraja. In 1993, he was awarded the Puttanna Kanagal Award for his contribution to the Kannada film industry as a director.

Family and early life

Siddalingaiah joined the film industry as both a floor and a spot boy for Navajyothi studios. He became an assistant for director Shanker Singh and later worked as junior actor and assistant as the protégé of B. Vittalacharya.

Siddalingaiah's son Murali was an actor in Tamil films. Murali died on the morning of 8 September 2010 in Chennai due to a massive heart attack. His grandson Atharvaa started his acting career in Baana Kaathadi in 2010.

Career

Siddalingaiah directed Mayor Muthanna in 1969 starring Rajkumar, Bharathi and Dwarakish in his film debut. He cast the same lead pair in Baalu Belagithu, Namma Samsara, Thayi Devaru and Bangaarada Manushya.

After Bangaarda Manushya, he worked with other actors including Vishnuvardhan, Ananth Nag, Lokesh and Srinivasa Murthy. He introduced his son Murali in the 1983 romantic drama Prema Parva. He also directed a Tamil film Puthir in 1986 with Murali as the lead actor. His last film, Prema Prema Prema, was released in 1999 after which he retired from directing.

Death

Siddalingaiah died on 14 March 2015 in Bangalore where he had been hospitalized for treatment of H1N1 influenza.

Filmography

References

External links
 

1936 births
2015 deaths
Screenwriters from Bangalore
Kannada film directors
Deaths from multiple organ failure
Kannada screenwriters
20th-century Indian film directors
20th-century Indian dramatists and playwrights
Film directors from Bangalore
Recipients of the Rajyotsava Award 2003